Setia Tropika is a township in Johor Bahru, Johor, Malaysia. It is owned by Setia Homes, a member of S P Setia Berhad.

Johor Bahru
Towns and suburbs in Johor Bahru District
Townships in Johor